Chempada (English: Red Army) is a 2008 Malayalam language thriller film written and directed by Robin Thirumala in his directorial debut. The film is based on the novel Avar Nagarathilund by M. D. Ajayaghosh which was serialised in Manorama Weekly.

Plot
The film revolves around a music troupe of youngsters named 'Red Army'. Headed by its mentor Captain Mukundan Menon, the group's real operations are to loot and kill people who have amassed wealth through wrong means and to cleanse the world of crime and injustice. Manu (Bala), a naive guy from Vagamon and son of a driver working for R. K. Nair, a rich planter, loved Meenakshi (Sreedevika), an innocent girl. But Meenakshi was raped by the planter and his accomplices. Being loyal to the master, Manu's father took the blame upon himself and got arrested. Things took a different turn when his father committed suicide in jail under suspicious circumstances and Meenakshi went missing. Manu then took up arms to avenge R. K. Nair and his men, but was beaten and left badly wounded in a desolate place, where he was found by the troupe members. Manu, who is later inducted into the troupe, gets a new name, Harikrishnan, and becomes active in the troupe's activities. What happens next forms the rest of the movie.

Cast
 Bala as Manu/Harikrishnan
 Sridevika as Meenakshi
 Lakshana as Reshmi
 Kochunni Prakash
 Tosh Christy
 Baburaj as Merkariyoz
 Kalabhavan Mani
K. B. Ganesh Kumar as A.S.P Ravishanker
Govind as Akash Nair
Nisha Sarang as Lekha
Sadiq as Paily
Robin A Thirumala as News Reporter (Cameo Appearance)

Soundtrack 
The film's soundtrack contains 10 songs, all composed by Musafir. Lyrics were by Robin Thirumala, Prakash Marar, Firoz Thikkodi.

References

External links
 Review, Sify.com
 Review, Oneindia.in
 Review, Indiaglitz.com

2008 films
2000s Malayalam-language films
Films based on Indian novels